The 1980 Colorado Buffaloes football team represented the University of Colorado in the Big Eight Conference during the 1980 NCAA Division I-A football season. Led by second-year head coach Chuck Fairbanks, the Buffaloes finished at 1–10 (1–6 in Big 8, tied for last), their second consecutive losing season, and played home games on campus at Folsom Field in Boulder, Colorado. 

Colorado's record in 1980 was the worst in program history, punctuated by an 82–42 home loss to Oklahoma in the conference opener, in which 63 records were set. The sole win was over Iowa State in early November; CU had the same record four years later; the 2012 team had an additional loss (1–11).

Schedule

Roster

References

External links
University of Colorado Athletics – 1980 football roster
Sports-Reference – 1980 Colorado Buffaloes

Colorado
Colorado Buffaloes football seasons
Colorado Buffaloes football